Marcus Grate (born 27 December 1996) is a Swedish cross-country skier. He competed in the sprint at the 2022 Winter Olympics.

Cross-country skiing results
All results are sourced from the International Ski Federation (FIS).

Olympic Games

Distance reduced to 30 km due to weather conditions.

World Championships

World Cup

Season standings

Team podiums
 1 podium – (1 )

References

External links

1996 births
Living people
Swedish male cross-country skiers
Cross-country skiers at the 2022 Winter Olympics
Olympic cross-country skiers of Sweden
People from Vaxholm Municipality